Tadej Vidmajer (born 10 March 1992) is a Slovenian football player who plays for ŁKS Łódź as a left-back.

References

External links
Tadej Vidmajer at NZS 

1992 births
Living people
Slovenian footballers
Association football fullbacks
NK Celje players
NK Šmartno 1928 players
ŁKS Łódź players
Slovenian PrvaLiga players
Slovenian Second League players
Ekstraklasa players
Slovenian expatriate footballers
Slovenian expatriate sportspeople in Poland
Expatriate footballers in Poland